Tischer Creek is a stream in the U.S. state of Minnesota. It empties into Lake Superior in the city of Duluth on the grounds of the Glensheen Historic Estate.  Its waters supply a 60,000 gallon reservoir and are used to maintain the grounds of the estate.

Tischer Creek was named after Urs and Elizabeth Tischer, pioneers who settled the area in the 1850s.

References

Rivers of Minnesota
Rivers of St. Louis County, Minnesota